The Roscoe P. Ward House is a historic house in Waseca, Minnesota, United States.  It was built from 1896 to 1897 and served as the family residence of a local leader in politics and finance.  It was listed on the National Register of Historic Places in 1982 for its local significance in the theme of architecture, commerce, and politics/government.  It was nominated for being Waseca's most prominent large residence and a manifestation of its commercial and industrial activity around the turn of the 20th century.

See also
 National Register of Historic Places listings in Waseca County, Minnesota

References

1897 establishments in Minnesota
Buildings and structures in Waseca County, Minnesota
Houses completed in 1897
Houses on the National Register of Historic Places in Minnesota
National Register of Historic Places in Waseca County, Minnesota
Neoclassical architecture in Minnesota